Potassium voltage-gated channel subfamily KQT member 5 is a protein that in humans is encoded by the KCNQ5 gene.

This gene is a member of the KCNQ potassium channel gene family that is differentially expressed in subregions of the brain and in skeletal muscle. The protein encoded by this gene yields currents that activate slowly with depolarization and can form heteromeric channels with the protein encoded by the KCNQ3 gene. Currents expressed from this protein have voltage dependences and inhibitor sensitivities in common with M-currents. They are also inhibited by M1 muscarinic receptor activation. Three alternatively spliced transcript variants encoding distinct isoforms have been found for this gene, but the full-length nature of only one has been determined.

Interactions
KCNQ5 has been shown to interact with KvLQT3.

See also
 Voltage-gated potassium channel

References

Further reading

Ion channels